Fulani extremism refers to violence by an ethnic group, the Fulani (also known as Fula or Fulɓe) against neighboring farmers of various ethnicities. Nigeria is considered a “melting pot” of different cultural and ethnic groups. Ethnic identification in the country is a complicated amalgamation of primordial and constructivist approaches.

Background 
The number of Fulani in Nigeria is estimated to be around 13 million. The primary ethnic groups that the Fulani come into conflict with are the Yoruba and the Igbo, although a total of 33 known groups participate in the farmer-pastoralist conflict in the country.

General history 
The Fulani are largely nomadic/semi-nomadic group of approximately 20 million individuals who live in the semi-arid climate of West Africa. It is important of course to emphasize that not all Fulani are extremists - the extremists are a subset of this larger ethnic group. The Fulani are a pastoralist group and their livelihood depends on herding cattle, and occasionally goats and sheep, along grazing routes. In recent years, as climate change has brought about increased desertification and a scarcity of resources, Fulani-farmer conflicts have increased in frequency. As Fulani nomads move southward into more fertile lands, there has been greater competition for grazing routes with local farmers, prompting violence.

While there are other kinds of herder-farmer conflicts in Nigeria, Fulani-farmer conflicts have been categorized as extremism because terrorism and extreme violence are frequently used as tactics to settle disputes. In some parts of Africa, such as in Mali, formal terrorist groups have been established. The Macina Liberation Front, or the Front de Libération du Macina (FLM) in Mali is an official jihadist group that has become intertwined with the Fulani pastoralists. While there is currently no formal organization in Nigeria, terrorist tactics are still common. These tactics include, but are not limited to, destroying crops, deadly riots, blocking traffic, raping women, beating up farmers, and instigating armed attacks on villages. The battle for fertile farming land and grazing routes has resulted in a significant amount of violence. These crises also occur throughout Guinea, Senegal, Mali, and Cameroon.

While the specific details of Fulani migration into Nigeria are largely unknown, it is generally assumed that the Fulani moved into Northern Nigeria from the Senegambia region in the thirteenth and fourteenth centuries. Since this initial migration, the Fulani have come into conflict with farmers in Nigeria.  Fulani extremist attacks are most prominent in the Kaduna, Plateau, and Benue states.

Over the course of several centuries, these conflicts have fluctuated in intensity based on a variety of social, political, economic, and environmental factors. Specifically, droughts, erratic rainfall, and the degradation of land in Nigeria have intensified the conflict.

Prominent attacks 
Fulani extremists are not consolidated under the rule of top-down leadership. Instead, attacks are operated on an individual, smaller-scale level, which is atypical of terrorist groups. As a result, it is difficult to both maintain a clear record of attacks and hold extremists accountable. The following are some, but not all, of the prominent attacks by Fulani extremists in Nigeria over the last five years.

Statistics 
 In 2018, Fulani extremists were responsible for 72% of terrorist-related deaths in Nigeria. The total death toll was 1,159 deaths.
 In 2019, just one year later, Fulani extremists were responsible for only 26% of terrorist-related deaths in Nigeria, accounting for 325 deaths.
 Between the years 2010 and 2016, Fulani extremists were responsible for 466 terrorist attacks and 3,068 deaths across several West-African countries.

Nigerian Grazing Reserve Act of 1964 
In 1964, the government passed this act, hoping that it would encourage the Fulani to adopt sedentary lifestyles and graze on these reserved lands.

Land Use Act of 1978 
In 1978, the government implemented the Land Use Act. This piece of legislation empowered the federal government to allocate land to different groups. Additionally, indigenous groups were granted the right to claim ownership of ancestral territories. The passage of the Land Use Act exacerbated the Fulani-farmer conflict, as the nomadic Fulani were largely excluded from the right to claim ownership of ancestral land.

Nigerian Agricultural Policy of 1988 
In an attempt to resolve the issues presented by the Land Use Act, the government has demarcated specific grazing reserves with the Nigerian Agricultural Policy. This law set aside a minimum 10% of the total territory of the country to be reserved for grazing. To date, this mandate has not been enforced to its fullest capacity.

Effects of conflict

Reduced crop yield 
The constant conflict between the pastoralists and the farmers has had a negative effect on farmer output. Fulani extremists indiscriminately destroy crops, negatively affecting agricultural production.

Displacement of farmers 
Farmers are displaced by this conflict, exacerbating poverty and disorder in the agricultural regions.

See also 
 Herder–farmer conflicts in Nigeria

References 

Pastoralists
Nomads
Fulani herdsmen attacks
Agriculture in Nigeria
Human rights abuses in Nigeria
Terrorism in Nigeria